The University of Massachusetts Amherst housing system is made up of six dormitory areas, two apartment areas, and one hotel. At UMass Amherst, first year students are required to live on campus. Housing is open to all full-time undergraduate students, regardless of year. Upper-class students who have continuously lived on campus during their first and sophomore years are guaranteed housing as long as they choose to live on campus. If, however, a student is admitted after their sophomore year, or moves off campus, and wants to move back onto campus, they are not guaranteed housing, but instead must go through a housing lottery, since demand outstrips supply. Building and room selection is accomplished by a complex system that takes into account building seniority as well as class year; those choosing to move from their building are subject to a lottery system. There are around 12,700 students living on-campus, giving it the third-largest on-campus residential population in the United States.

Students living on the UMass campus live in one of the seven residential areas: North, Sylvan, Northeast, Central, Orchard Hill, Southwest, and the Commonwealth Honors College. Several residential areas have a student-run business. All campus residence halls are staffed by Resident Assistants, who provide programming and community development, as well as enforce policies, and have quiet hours, which start at 9 pm on weekdays and midnight on the weekends, though they may vary from hall to hall.

Residential areas

Northeast
Northeast is across the street from North and diagonal to Sylvan. The residential area consists of nine buildings assembled in a rectangle surrounding a grassy quad. The quad also contains two volleyball courts that are open during the fall and spring season as well as hosts periodic academic celebrations that include games, activities, and food. Northeast is one of the oldest residential areas on campus and has what one might call classic academic architecture, consisting of red brick buildings and gabled/shingled roofs. Thatcher is unique because it has a foreign language program, which includes several floors, each with a different language. The residents of these floors are encouraged to speak the language they are studying with their floor-mates. Lewis Hall offers the Asian-American Student Program. Leach Hall and Dwight Hall house the Engineering Connect Residential Academic Programs (RAPs),  Crabtree Hall houses the Animal Science Majors RAP, and Knowlton Hall houses the CNS Connect RAP.

First year halls include Crabtree, Dwight, Hamlin, Leach, Mary Lyon, and Knowlton. These buildings are a part of the Residential First-Year Experience (RFYE). Multi-Year halls include three buildings: Johnson, Lewis, and Thatcher.

Northeast is also home to Worcester Commons. Renovated in 2020, this building contains a dining common, lounge area, café, fitness center, and meeting spaces.

Buildings
Sarah L. Arnold House (Now home to the School of Public Health & Health Sciences)
Charlotte M. Crabtree House
Minnie E. Dwight House
Margaret Hamlin House
Anna M. Johnson House
Helen Knowlton House
Lottie A. Leach House
Edward M. Lewis House
Mary M. Lyon House
Roscoe W. Thatcher House

Central
Central is unique because it has three academic buildings in addition to nine residence halls located along a hill on the east side of campus. Academic buildings in Central include New Africa House and Fernald Hall. New Africa House has a particularly interesting history; the building was formerly known as Mills House, and was a dormitory prior to an incident in 1969 when a group of black students seized the building and barricaded themselves within, ordering all white residents to either join forces with them or get out of the building. The faculty of the newly formed Afro-American Studies department responded by moving its offices into the building to show solidarity with the black students, and the building became New Africa House.

Central is organized into 4 clusters of buildings: Gorman-Wheeler and Brett-Brooks at the bottom of the hill, Baker, Chadbourne, and Greenough ("BCG") organized in a quad halfway up the hill, and Van Meter-Butterfield ("VMB") at the top of the hill. Gorman House was previously a building-wide Living Learning Community called NUANCE. Founded in 1989, it was a diversity awareness Living Learning Community. It also offered substance-free housing on its Wellness floor. As of the 2009–2010 academic year, Gorman House become freshmen-only and discontinued the NUANCE theme and wellness floor. Wheeler used to be home to the Central Art Gallery, which was closed in 2008 and transformed into dorm rooms. Brett is a nine-month housing dorm, allowing students to stay during breaks for a fee. As of 2014 Wheeler was converted into a first year residence hall. Brett has had a reputation for being a popular option for student-athletes before the North Apartments were built, and still houses the freshman hockey players. Brooks is the only all-Wellness dorm on campus, requiring all of its residents to abstain from substance use. Baker, one of the largest dorms on campus, houses the Area Office. Greenough is home to the Greeno Sub Shop, another one of the student run businesses. Chadbourne houses the Josephine White Eagle Native American Cultural Center. Van Meter is the largest dorm in the residential area in terms of residents, while Butterfield is the smallest and has a rich community history. Both Van Meter and Butterfield are freshmen-only housing.

University Health Services is located next to Brett and Brooks halls, on Infirmary Way. Central is serviced by Franklin Dining Common, across the street from Brett and Wheeler. Franklin contains kosher and vegan dining options as well as a convenience store.

Buildings
Hugh P. Baker House
Alden C. Brett House
William P. Brooks House
Kenyon L. Butterfield House
Paul A. Chadbourne House
James C. Greenough House
Edwin D. Gorman House
Henry F. Hills House North (No longer a dormitory, demolished in late 2017)
Henry F. Hills House South (No longer a dormitory, demolished in late 2017)
New Africa House (formerly George Mills House, no longer a dormitory)
Ralph A. Van Meter House
William Wheeler House

Orchard Hill
Completed in 1964, the Orchard Hill residence area is located in an old apple orchard which still blooms every spring. It is located to the north of the Central residential area, and to the east of the main academic campus. Orchard Hill is composed of four residence halls: Dickinson, Webster, Grayson and Field. Currently, Dickinson and Webster buildings are Residential First-Year Experience (RFYE) housing.

Webster and Dickinson house Computer Science Residential Academic Programs (RAPs).

Each of the four buildings is built to the same basic schematics. They have 7 floors, with two corridors branching off from a lobby/elevator area on each floor. Each building contains 166 doubles. Orchard Hill houses a maximum of approximately 1,500 students.

Besides the residential area, Orchard Hill also refers to the hill on which the Orchard Hill Observatory and a cell phone tower are located. Field also houses Sweets 'n More, a student run business on campus. 

Orchard Hill is the only residential area on campus where single rooms are not offered; all of the rooms in the four buildings are doubles or expanded housing (four residents) in converted lounges. The area is serviced by both Franklin and Worcester Dining Commons, which are roughly the same distance.

Buildings
Emily E. Dickinson House
Eugene Field House
David Grayson House
Noah Webster House

Southwest

Southwest is the largest residential area on the UMass campus. It consists of five 22-story towers—named after four U.S. Presidents born in or associated with Massachusetts (John Adams, John Quincy Adams, Calvin Coolidge, and John F. Kennedy), and George Washington – (Coolidge and the all-freshman Kennedy are side-by-side in the north and John Quincy Adams, John Adams and Washington are arranged in a cluster in the south, the latter two facing the same direction) and eleven smaller residence halls, also known as low-rises (the height of which varies from building to building), holding a total of around 5,500 students. The low-rises are arranged as such: two freshman-only clusters in the north (James-Emerson and Thoreau-Melville), a freshman-only cluster in the south (Cance, Moore, and Pierpont), and located along Sunset Avenue to the east are two clusters (Prince-Crampton in the north and MacKimmie-Patterson in the south) offering nine-month housing. Cluster offices are located in James, Melville, Cance, Prince, MacKimmie, Pierpont, and in each of the five towers. Additionally, Thoreau and Cance are home to the area office for the north and south portions of Southwest, respectively. Moore is home to the Residence Life Resource Center. Meanwhile, JQA and Washington are the homes to two of the Residential Wellness Center facilities offered on campus.

Southwest houses three of the five campus dining commons, including the inactive Hampden Dining Common which houses Southwest's only convenience store. Hampshire is in the north and the newly renovated Berkshire is in the south, both offering traditional food. Berkshire also offers Late Night, a popular snack-oriented option open until midnight 7 days a week. Hampden was initially planned to be a tower for graduate students and stories as to why it instead became a dining common vary, although the rumor of a construction collapse is not true.  The Connecticut River is a fault line and there may have been problems driving the pilings deep enough to reach bedrock but most reports are that the yield on the bonds was less than anticipated and they simply ran out of money.  Hampden is host to the Hampden Art Gallery, Convenience Store (C-Store), Southwest Area Government (SWAG) Office, Latin American Cultural Center (LACC) and the Southwest Cafe & Pita Pit.

Also found in Crampton in Southwest is the Stonewall Center, a resource for LGBT students and allies.

Southwest houses approximately 50% of the students living on campus. Southwest is known for its lively, festive, and active community spirit, often stereotyped (both positively and negatively) as a center for "party" activity. After both victories and losses by the New England Patriots and Boston Red Sox in 2002, 2003 and 2004, as well as after the December 2006 UMass defeat in the NCAA Division I-AA football championship game, students held large impromptu festive gatherings (also referred to as riots) in the Southwest Mall which led to injuries, incidents of property destruction, and significant police involvement.

Throughout the past few years, UMass administration has tried to control such “riots” from occurring by planning school run events in the residential area. Throughout the 2013 World Series, the dining halls and residence halls planned viewing parties for the game between Massachusetts’ own Boston Red Sox while they were trying to take down the St. Louis Cardinals for the championship. For the clinching game of the World Series, UMass student affairs put on an event outside of the residence buildings so fans could enjoy the game peacefully but with excitement. An email was sent to all students, stating “As you watch the games – on or off campus – please remember to represent the campus well,” (Enku Gelaye - Vice Chancellor for Student Affairs and Campus Life) along with a link to a Responsible Fan website that gives rules and regulations for such events. Despite this, the administration was not entirely successful in keeping students in check. There were 15 arrests on the night of October 30, 2013. Pepper balls and smoke bombs were set off by police to disperse the rioting crowd and what started as a friendly community viewing of the baseball game turned into a frenzy of students running away from riot police.

Buildings
Alexander E. Cance House
Calvin Coolidge Tower
Guy C. Crampton House
Ralph Waldo Emerson House
Clark H. James House
John Adams Tower
John Quincy Adams Tower
John F. Kennedy Tower
Anderson A. MacKimmie House
Herman Melville House
Franklin Moore House
Charles H. Patterson House
Mildred Pierpont House
Walter E. Prince House
Southwest (North) Dormitory III (planned as the third of six towers, but it instead became a dining commons for a few reasons)
Henry David Thoreau House
George Washington Tower

Sylvan
Sylvan was built to house medical students. The UMass Medical Center, located in Worcester, was initially planned to be on the Amherst Campus between Sylvan and Health Services, with both being built in anticipation of the larger medical school intended to be built between them. Sylvan was constructed in the early 1970s. 

Sylvan is adjacent to the North Residential Area. Sylvan contains three, eight-story towers: McNamara, Brown, and Cashin. Sylvan is distinctive for offering suite-style living in a shady wooded area. Each residence hall contains 64 suites, each suite is either all female, all male, or co-ed (only in Cashin and McNamara). Cashin is the 9-month break housing dormitory in the Sylvan Residential Area.

Each suite is a mixture of double and single rooms, a common bathroom, and a common living room. Suites accommodate six to eight residents. Sylvan is also home to the Sylvan Snack Bar (SSB) one of eight student-run businesses on campus. The SSB delivers food right to students doors in the Sylvan living area.

Buildings
Henry D. Brown House
William M. Cashin House
Elizabeth McNamara House

Commonwealth Honors College Residential Community
The Commonwealth Honors College Residential Community is a residence area reserved for members of the Commonwealth Honors College, completed in late 2013. Featuring six dormitory buildings, an advising center, offices, classrooms, and a cafe (Roots), it can house about 1,500 students. The area is bordered by the Recreation Center and Dickinson Hall to the north, Boyden Gym to the south, Tobin Hall and Goodell to the east, and Commonwealth Avenue on the west. Two halls, Sycamore and Oak, are designed to accommodate first-year students, and the other four halls (Elm, Linden, Maple, and Birch), which contain suites and apartments, are designed as multi-year residence halls.

Buildings
 Birch Hall
 Commonwealth Honors College Building
 Elm Hall
 Linden Hall
 Maple Hall
 Oak Hall
 Sycamore Hall

Apartments

North
The North Apartments opened in the Fall of 2006. Located between Sylvan and Northeast, these apartment-style dormitories house approximately 850 undergraduates in four buildings. The buildings are currently named North A, B, C, and D. Each unit comprises four single bedrooms, two full bathrooms, and a shared common area including a full kitchen. Other amenities include Ethernet and cable access, central air, and laundry on-site. This is a nine-month break housing area, which allows students to remain on campus from September to May.

Buildings
 North Residential Building A
 North Residential Building B
 North Residential Building C
 North Residential Building D

Planned residential areas

Northwest Residential Area
The Northwest Residential Area was a residential dorm area for campus that was planned to be built north of where the parking lots for parking services are today. The only references for this dorm complex exist on maps of the 1960s, there was also a second proposed interchange with Route 116 in this location.

The problem was (is) that this is all swampland (forested wetland) and the Clean Water Act of 1972 put an end to filling in wetlands. Hence while the North Village and (privately owned) Presidential apartment complexes were built on filled-in wetlands (with Presidential built on UMass demo debris), the 1972 law brought all plans to further develop this area to a screeching halt.

Even if filling in the land could somehow be permitted, it would be exceedingly expensive to do as (a), there is really no place to drain the water to, and (b), water from adjacent development (notably Route 116) has increased the water here.

Hotel
Hotel UMass is a school-run hotel located above the Campus Center. The hotel is used to train students in the Hotel and Hospitality program. In addition, if a student isn't able to find a room immediately, they are placed in the hotel at regular rates.

Former buildings
Several of the lecture halls and administration buildings formerly served as dorms. Draper Hall was one of them, built in 1905, the building served as one of the first woman's dorms as well as a dining common. Many of its larger windows have since been filled in, and today it serves as office space for the College of Social and Behavioral Sciences.

The first dorm for women was the Abigail Adams House. Built in 1920, its name was the result of a contest to all women students of the college as well as all female high school students in the state. This dorm suffered a disastrous fire in 1962 (flames spread rapidly through combustible ceiling panels) and was converted to office use until being razed in 1967 to make way for the John W. Lederle Graduate Research Center, but another woman's dorm, Butterfield, would be named in honor of President Kenyon Butterfield, the college president in the early 1920s and one of the proponents of the Adams House at the time it was built.

The present day South College was once both a dormitory as well as a laboratory, the building was originally built in 1867 but was then rebuilt in 1885 due to a fire that gutted the insides. The fire is believed to have been caused by the explosion of a kerosene burner for an egg incubator. South's sibling dorm, North College, was built in 1868 and housed around 64 students. The dormitory was then razed in 1955 to make room for Machmer Hall.

Mills House became New Africa House.

In the late 1940s, the University Apartments were built to provide housing for returning veterans. In the winter of 2009–2010, the buildings were torn down and the site was turned into a parking lot. Another complex of dorms was built for married couples, veterans and upperclassmen in the 1940s just across the street from where Southwest stands today. These "cinder block dorms", collectively known as County Circle, were named for five Massachusetts counties—Berkshire, Plymouth, Suffolk, Middlesex and Hampshire County. Of the five original buildings, only three (Middlesex House, Berkshire House and Hampshire House) remain. Currently Hampshire House is home to local NPR station WFCR, while Berkshire and Middlesex are used for storage and office space. Plymouth House and Suffolk House were torn down in the late 1960s to make way for Massachusetts Avenue, which runs between the complex and Southwest.

Hills House, two four-story buildings connected by a shared first floor lobby, was built as a men's dorm in 1960.  Seriously damaged by vandalism, it use as a dormitory was abandoned in 1969 and it was "temporally" used as academic space until being demolished in 2017.

References

External links

Massachusetts Amherst
University of Massachusetts Amherst
Massachusetts Amherst, University of, residence halls